Edgar Amos Love (September 10, 1891 – May 1, 1974) was an American educator, minister, and activist.

Early life

Edgar Amos Love was born September 10, 1891, in Harrisonburg, Virginia. His father, the Rev. Julius C. Love, was a widely respected minister in the Methodist Episcopal Church. His mother, Susie Love (née Carr), was also a licensed minister and the first woman to graduate from Morgan College. Due to the pastoral obligations of his father, Edgar spent portions of his childhood in parts of Maryland, Virginia, and West Virginia. He was one of seven children.

Education

Love graduated from the Academy of Morgan College (Baltimore) in 1909 and earned his Bachelor of Arts degree from Howard University in 1913. In 1916 Love attained his Bachelor of Divinity degree from the Howard Divinity School, after which he matriculated to the Boston University School of Theology, obtaining his Bachelor of Sacred Theology in 1918.

Founding of Omega Psi Phi
On November 17, 1911, Love and two other Howard students, Oscar James Cooper and Frank Coleman, established Omega Psi Phi Fraternity, Inc. They enlisted the guidance of Ernest Everett Just to assist them in their endeavor. Omega Psi Phi Fraternity was the first black fraternity founded on a black campus. The young men selected Manhood, Scholarship, Perseverance, and Uplift as their Cardinal Principles. Love was a charter member for Howard's Alpha Chapter on December 15, 1911 and served two non-consecutive terms as Grand Basileus (President).

Career

During World War I, Love spent fourteen months overseas, serving as a chaplain in the United States Army. Upon honorable discharge he became a professor at Morgan College for two years, devoting additional time as the school's athletic director. It is in this time that Love met and married Virginia L. Ross on June 16, 1923. Their union would produce one son, Jon E. Love. After leaving Morgan, Love upheld the tradition of his parents and embarked on a career as a Methodist minister. He guided various congregations in Pennsylvania, West Virginia, and Maryland; the most prominent being John Wesley Church in Baltimore.

In 1933 Love was tapped as District Superintendent of the Washington Conference of the Methodist Church. This, along with his appointment to lead the Methodist Department of Negro Work in 1940, proved to be a stepping stone to his election on June 22, 1952 as Bishop of the segregated Central Conference (Baltimore area) of the Methodist Church. Bishop Love presided in this capacity for twelve years. He emerged from retirement from November, 1966 through June, 1967 to serve as Bishop of the Atlantic Coast Area, which at the time spanned churches in Alabama, Florida, Georgia, and Mississippi.

Civic Life and Professional Affiliations

All the while maintaining his leadership in the Methodist church, Bishop Love was a trustee for numerous black colleges and universities, including his beloved Morgan. He also served on the Maryland Inter-Racial Commission under Gov. Albert C. Ritchie. In addition to his life membership in the NAACP, Bishop Love belonged to a variety of professional societies, including the Prince Hall Free Masons (having been a founding member of Corinthian Lodge #18 in Washington, D.C.), Sigma Pi Phi, the Benevolent and Improved Benevolent Protective Order of Elks of the World, Frontiers Clubs of America, and the American Legion.

Death

Bishop Love died May 1, 1974 in Baltimore, Maryland at the age of 82.

References

Further reading

1891 births
1974 deaths
African-American academics
Howard University alumni
Boston University School of Theology alumni
World War I chaplains
United States Army chaplains
Omega Psi Phi founders
20th-century American clergy
20th-century African-American people